Donnybrook stone is a fine to medium-grained feldspathic and kaolinitic sandstone found near the town of Donnybrook, Western Australia.  It originates from the early Cretaceous (144-132 MYA) and features shale partings and colour variations which range from white to beige and pink.

Donnybrook stone is used as dimension stone in the building industry and is both a commercial name as well as a stratigraphic name.

Many public and private buildings in Western Australia feature Donnybrook stone.  These include the facade and portico to the Parliament House building in West Perth, the General Post Office in Perth, the entry portal to the Fremantle Railway Station and the Police Courts building in Beaufort Street, Perth, the latter of which is constructed entirely of Donnybrook stone.

History
Gold was found in Donnybrook in the mid-1890s and was being mined there in late 1898.  There was controversy regarding its usage in the early twentieth century.

There were up to eight quarries producing Donnybrook stone in and around the town in the 1930s. Most of these have since closed, however, in 1981 the Goldfields Quarry on the Upper Capel Road re-opened and now produces material for floor tiles and facing slabs.  Several of the closed quarries are on the Donnybrook-Balingup Road.

Usage
The following list is from a 1984 publication - some items might have since been renamed as structures, demolished or changed:

Perth
 GPO - Forrest Place - upper floors
 Commonwealth Bank Building, (CBC bank) - corner of Murray Street and Forrest Place upper floors
 Parliament House, Perth - Harvest Terrace frontage - Main entrance, column facings and building frontage.  First floor - central portion
 Supreme Court of Western Australia - Riverside drive frontage - external walls of basement
 Police Courts - Beaufort Street - whole building
 Public Health Department - Murray Street - whole building
 State Library, James Street - arches to first floor and second floor balcony
 Museum Building, Beaufort Street - window arches and sills
 Government Stores, Murray Street - ground floor facing, window lintels and gable ends
 University of Western Australia - Winthrop Hall

Fremantle
 Railway Station
 Customs House
 St John's Anglican church
 St Patricks Catholic church
 Scottish House

See also 
 Tamala Limestone

References

Further reading
 
 Fetherston, J.M. 2007 Dimension stone in Western Australia. Volume 1: Industry review and dimension stones of the southwest region. Geological Survey of Western Australia. Mineral Resources Bulletin 23 181p 
 Freeman, M.J., Donaldson, M.J. 2004 Major mineral deposits of southwestern Western Australia – a field guide Geological Survey of Western Australia. Record 2004/17 38p

Geology of Western Australia
Geologic formations of Australia
Building materials